Duxbury is a coastal town in Plymouth County, Massachusetts, United States; located near Boston.

Duxbury may also refer to:

Places 
 Navy Nagar or Duxbury, a cantonment area in the Colaba area of Mumbai, India
 Duxbury (CDP), Massachusetts, a census-designated place in Duxbury, Massachusetts, U.S.
 Duxbury, Minnesota, an unincorporated community in east–central Minnesota, U.S.
 Duxbury, Vermont, a town located in central Vermont, U.S.

Other uses
 Duxbury (surname)
 USS Duxbury Bay (AVP-38), a United States Navy seaplane tender in commission from 1944 to 1966

See also
 Duxbury Bay (Massachusetts), a bay on the coast of Massachusetts
 Duxbury Beach, a beach in Duxbury, Massachusetts
 Duxbury Woods, a place in Lancashire, England
 Duxbury Hall, a country house in Duxbury Woods
 South Duxbury, Massachusetts, a census-designated place (CDP) in Duxbury, Massachusetts